{{DISPLAYTITLE:C18H12O9}}
The molecular formula C18H12O9 may refer to:

 Eckol
 Norstictic acid
 Variegatic acid

Molecular formulas